A Fairy Tale for the Old is a Russian crime drama film directed by Fyodor Lavrov and Roman Mikhaylov. This film was theatrically released on October 13, 2022. The film is a laureate of the Golden Taiga Award at the 20th Spirit of Fire Film Festival (Russia).

Plot 
The film follows a crime boss who decides to send his children to look for a bandit named Muli, who was killed three years ago and suddenly met in three cities at the same time. Each of the characters now goes to a place where everything is not as it seems.

Cast 
 Kirill Polukhin as Shooter
 Fyodor Lavrov as Average
 Roman Mikhaylov as Jr
 Yevgeny Tkachuk as Mulya
 Viktoriya Miroshnichenko as Mulya's girlfriend
 Anatoly Tishin as Dad
 Oleg Vasilkov as bandit from Novosibirsk
 Oleg Garkusha as villager
 Sergei Pakhomov as club owner in St. Petersburg
 Andrei Blednyy as conductor
 Eldar Salavatov as cameo
 Mikhail Kurtov as episode

References

External links 
 

2022 films
2020s Russian-language films
2022 crime drama films
Russian crime drama films

2022 directorial debut films